The term control card can refer to:

 A document or device used in orienteering that is marked by some means at each control point to show that the competitor has completed the course correctly
 A document carried in the long-distance cycling sport randonneuring
 In computing, a specific type of punched card used for job control instructions
 A circuit board containing electronics for motion control

See also
Control panel (disambiguation)